Ozan may refer to:

Companies
 Ozan Lumber Company, a former company based in Arkansas

People
, an itinerant poet, poet-singer  (similar to "bard", "balladeer", or "troubadour") in Turkic traditions, predating the term ashik

Given name
"Ozan" in the meaning "poet-singer" may be used as  a Turkish male given name.
 Ozan Çolakoğlu (born 1972), Turkish composer, songwriter, and music producer
 Ozan Güven (born 1975), Turkish actor
 Ozan İpek (born 1986), Turkish footballer
 Ozan Kabak (born 2000), Turkish footballer
 Ozan Marsh (1920–1992), American pianist
 Ozan Musluoğlu (born 1977), Turkish musician and former member of the ska band Athena
 Ozan Papaker (born 1996), Turkish footballer
 Ozan Tufan (born 1995), Turkish footballer

Epithet
 Arif Şirin (1949–2019), commonly known as Ozan Arif, Turkish lyricist, composer, singer, and bağlama performer

Surname
 Pepe Ozan (1939–2013), Argentine sculptor and artistic director
 Can Ozan, Turkish musician and record producer
 Ozerk Ozan

Places
 Ozan, Arkansas, a town in the United States
 Ozan, Ain, a commune in the Ain department in France
Ozan, original name of Ozanköy, Nallıhan, a village in Turkey
 Ozan, Gölbaşı, a village in Adıyaman Province, Turkey
 Ozan, Iran (disambiguation), places in Iran
Ozan Formation, geologic formation in Arkansas, Oklahoma and Texas

See also

 Ozanköy (disambiguation)